Snyder Township may refer to places in the U.S. state of Pennsylvania:

Snyder Township, Blair County, Pennsylvania
Snyder Township, Jefferson County, Pennsylvania

Pennsylvania township disambiguation pages